The Albrecht-Penck-Medaille is a scientific award of the Deutsche Quartärvereinigung (German Quaternary Union), given to an individual who made outstanding contributions in the fields of Quaternary science. The award is named after German geomorphologist Albrecht Penck (1858–1945).

Laureates 
Source: German Quaternary Association

 1958: Henri Breuil, Franz Firbas, Rudolf Grahmann, Raimund von Klebelsberg, Paul Woldstedt
 1962: Knud Jessen, Władysław Szafer
 1964: Carl Troll
 1966: Richard F. Flint, Alfred Rust
 1968: Karl Gripp, Julius Büdel
 1970: Konrad Richter
 1972: André Cailleux, Waldo H. Zagwijn
 1974: Raijmund Galon, Hans Graul
 1978: J. K. Iwanowa, Gerald Richmond
 1980: Vojen Loek, Martin Schwarzbach
 1982: Julius Fink, Ingo Schaefer, Harry Godwin
 1985: Max Welten, Erich Schönhals
 1986: Karl Brunnacker
 1988: Aleksis Dreimanis, Richard G. West
 1990: Lothar Eissmann, Helmut Müller
 1992: Hans Poser
 1994: Arno Semmel, Heinz Kliewe, Alfred Jahn
 1996: Hans-Jürgen Beug
 1998: Frans Gullentops, Gerd Lüttig, J. E. Mojski
 2000: René Handtke, Helmut Heuberger, Samuel Wegmüller
 2002: Herbert Liedtke, Werner Schulz
 2004: Karl-Ernst Behre
 2006: Horst Hagedorn, Mebus A. Geyh
 2008: Hermann Jerz, Dirk van Husen
 2010: Klaus-Dieter Meyer, Hansjörg Streif
 2012: Christian Schüchter, Charles Turner
 2014: Ruth Drescher-Schneider, Klaus-Dieter Jäger

See also

 List of geology awards

References 

Geology awards
Awards established in 1958